Delateralization is a replacement of a lateral consonant by a central consonant.

Yeísmo

Arguably, the best known example of this sound change is yeísmo, which occurs in many Spanish and some Galician dialects.

In accents with yeísmo, the palatal lateral approximant  merges with the palatal approximant  which, phonetically, can be an affricate  (word-initially and after ), an approximant  (in other environments) or a fricative  (in the same environments as the approximant, but only in careful speech).

In Romanian, the palatal lateral approximant  merged with  centuries ago. The same happened to the historic palatal nasal , although that is an example of lenition.

Arabic Ḍād

The affricated form is suggested by loans of ḍ into Akkadian as ld or lṭ and into Malaysian as dl. However, some linguists, such as the French orientalist André Roman supposes that the letter was actually a pharyngealized voiced alveolo-palatal sibilant , similar to the Polish ź, which is not a lateral sound.

In modern Arabic, there are three possible realizations of this sound, all of which are central:
 Pharyngealized voiced alveolar stop 
 Pharyngealized voiced dental stop 
 Velarized voiced dental stop .

References 

Lateral consonants
Sound changes
Central consonants